Alcanena is a portuguese town and municipality of Ribatejo in Santarém District. The population in 2011 was 13,868, in an area of 127.33 km².

The current Mayor is Rui Anastácio (Partido Social Democrata) and the president of the Municipal Assembly is Silvestre Pereira (Socialist Party). The municipal holiday is Ascension Day.

Parishes
Administratively, the municipality is divided into 7 civil parishes (freguesias):
 Alcanena e Vila Moreira
 Bugalhos
 Malhou, Louriceira e Espinheiro
 Minde
 Moitas Venda
 Monsanto 
 Serra de Santo António

Notable people 
 Alfredo Roque Gameiro (1864 in Minde - 1935) a painter, specialized in watercolors
 Maria da Conceição Moita (1937–2021) an educator and political activist 
 Carlos Calado (born 1975) a Portuguese long jumper.

See also
Casais Robustos – village located in Serras de Aire e Candeeiros Natural Park
Serras de Aire e Candeeiros Natural Park – one of 30 protected areas in the county

References

External links
Local council official website 
Photos from ALCANENA

 
Populated places in Santarém District
Municipalities of Santarém District